Wonderwall is a 1968 British psychedelic film directed by Joe Massot  (in his feature directorial debut), starring Jack MacGowran, Jane Birkin, Irene Handl, Richard Wattis and Iain Quarrier, and featuring a cameo by Dutch collective the Fool, who were also set designers for the film.

The film is also remembered for its soundtrack album, Wonderwall Music, composed by George Harrison of the Beatles.

Plot
The reclusive, eccentric scientist Oscar Collins (Jack MacGowran) has two next-door neighbours: a pop photographer (Iain Quarrier) and his girlfriend/model Penny Lane (Jane Birkin). Discovering a beam of light streaming through a hole in the wall between them, Collins follows the light and spots Penny modelling for a photo shoot. He begins to make more holes as days go by and becomes a Peeping Tom as they do more photo sessions. Oscar gradually becomes infatuated with the girl, and feels a part of the couple's lives, even forsaking work to observe them. When they quarrel and the couple splits, Penny takes an overdose of pills and passes out, but Oscar comes to her rescue.

Cast
 Jack MacGowran as Prof. Oscar Collins
 Jane Birkin as Penny Lane
 Irene Handl as Mrs Peurofoy
 Richard Wattis as Perkins
 Iain Quarrier as young man
 Beatrix Lehmann as mother
 Brian Walsh as photographer
 Sean Lynch as Riley
 Bee Duffell as Mrs Charmer
 Noel Trevarthen as policeman

Cast notes:
Suki Potier, Amanda Lear and Anita Pallenberg had small roles uncredited in the film as girls at a party.

Soundtrack

The soundtrack was composed by Beatle George Harrison, whom Massot approached specially for the project. Harrison had never done a film soundtrack, and told Massot he did not know how to do it, but when Massot promised to use whatever Harrison created, Harrison took the job.

Deciding to make the soundtrack an anthology of Indian and Indian-inspired music, Harrison recorded a series of short ragas at EMI's recording studio in Bombay in January 1968. He mixed these selections with pieces in the rock and other Western musical styles, which he recorded in London. Timing the segments with a stopwatch as he watched the unfinished film, Harrison built up a varied musical programme. The film soundtrack and accompanying album featured a track called “Skiing”; it is notable for featuring, uncredited, guitarist Eric Clapton. Clapton’s appearance here is the first of many recorded collaborations between the two great guitarists. The soundtrack album (Wonderwall Music), the first solo Beatles record, was released in November 1968 by Apple Records as the company's first LP. Wonderwall Music also appeared on compact disc in 1992, during reissues of the Apple catalogue, being reissued again in 2014.

Release history
The film premiered at the Cannes Film Festival on 17 May 1968, with George Harrison, his wife Pattie, Ringo Starr, his wife Maureen, and the cast members of the film in attendance. The premiere in London was on 12 January 1969. The film won an award, but did not gain a proper distribution deal. A print finally appeared on the American midnight movies circuit in the 1970s, and on home video in the 1980s and 1990s, all of rather low technical quality.

In 1998, 30 years after the film's release, and with Massot an established film director, he decided to restore and re-release his first film. Harrison's search for master recordings turned up a lyrical song, "In the First Place" by the Remo Four, which he had not submitted the first time around, believing Massot wanted only instrumental music. "In the First Place" was released as a single in 1999. Harrison is believed to have not only produced it, but also sung and played on it, although he asked to be credited only as producer. Massot was happy to include the song in the restored film, which got a distribution deal.

The restored version of Wonderwall, both in theatrical and director's cut versions, is available on HD blu-ray and low definition DVD through Shout! Factory in the United States, with bonus features.

Critical reception
Critical opinion of the film was mixed. TV Guide panned the film, giving it one star out of four. Other critics were more positive. Budd Wilkins, writing for Slant Magazine, criticized the "slender-to-the-edge-of-nonexistent narrative" and "hopelessly square" underlying point, but enjoyed the film overall, saying it was "best taken for the sensory provocation of its eye-popping set designs and the spaced-out world music ambience of its soundtrack" in his 3.5 (out of 5) star review. Keith Phipps, reviewing the film for The Dissolve, wrote "The film is mostly just an excuse to experiment. And while not all the experiments work out, the film remains a charming relic of a bygone era of light shows, sitar sounds, and over-the-top symbolism."

References

External links
 
 

1968 films
1968 directorial debut films
1968 drama films
1960s British films
1960s English-language films
British drama films
Films directed by Joe Massot
Films scored by George Harrison
Psychedelic films